Nemyryntsi is a village in Berdychiv Raion, Zhytomyr Oblast (province) of Ukraine on Drevlians historic lands. It has a population of 772 people.

History 
1556        founded village Nemyryntsi.

1556-1569   part of Grand Duchy of Lithuania

1569-1793   part of Polish–Lithuanian Commonwealth, Kiev Voivodeship

1793-1846   part of Russian Empire, Kiev Guberniya
   
1846-1917   part of Russian Empire, Kiev Guberniya, Berdychiv Uyezd.

1917-1919   part of Ukrainian People's Republic, Ukrainian People's Republic, Hetmanate, Ukrainian People's Republic.

1919-1923   part of USSR, Kiev Guberniya, Berdychiv Uyezd.

1923-1937   part of USSR, Kiev Guberniya, Berdychiv Okrug.
 
1930-1937   part of USSR, Kiev Oblast, Ruzhyn Raion.

22.09.1937-1931 part of USSR, Zhytomyr Oblast, Ruzhyn Raion.

1991-       part of Ukraine, Zhytomyr Oblast, Ruzhyn Raion.

Common local names
Hrabchak, Nikitenko, Markitan, Dziubenko, Davydchuk, Khodakivskyi, Possessor (Renter, Lessee, Tenant, Possessor), Yastrubenko, Pylyponchyk, Rozhkovskyi, Rozhkivskyi, Zayats, Krasnitskyi

Famous people 
 Khrystofor Baranovsky

Images

Nearby villages
Ruzhyn (Ружин)
Bilylivka (Білилівка)
Koziatyn (Козятин)
Berdychiv (Бердичів)
Skvyra (Сквира)
Pohrebysche (Погребище)
Bila Tserkva (Біла Церква)

See also
Mamai

External links

 Climate in village Nemyryntsi
 Архіви України, Archives of Ukraine 

Berdichevsky Uyezd

Villages in Berdychiv Raion